Nubia is the region along the Nile in Northern Sudan and Southern Egypt.

Nubia could also mean:

 Nubian sandstone, a geologic formation in the eastern Sahara, north-east Africa and Arabia
 New Ulaanbaatar International Airport, a new airport under construction in Ulaanbaatar, Mongolia (provisional title)
 SS Nubia (disambiguation), several ships 
 Nubia Technology, a Chinese smartphone brand and subsidiary of ZTE
 Nubia (character), a fictional DC Comics character centered in the Wonder Woman comics
 Nubia, one of the four main characters in the Roman Mysteries series
 Nubia, a fictional planet that is mentioned in some Star Wars media

See also
 Nubian languages
 Nubian Pharaohs
 Brand Nubian